Stephanie is a female name.

Stephanie or Stefanie may also refer to:

People with the name
 Stephanie (singer, born August 1987), American singer in Japan
 Stephanie (singer, born October 1987), American singer in South Korea
 Princess Stéphanie (disambiguation), several royals

Arts, entertainment, and media
 Stefanie (film), a 1958 West German comedy film
 Stephanie (film), a 2017 horror film
 Stefanie (album), a 2004 album by Stefanie Sun
 Stephanie (LazyTown), a fictional character from the TV show LazyTown
 Stephanie (The Walking Dead)

Places
 Lake Stefanie, a lake in Southern Ethiopia

See also 
 
 
 Stef
 Stefani (disambiguation)
 Stefania (disambiguation)
 Steff
 Steffl
 Stephan (disambiguation)
 Stephen (disambiguation)